The WWL World Trios Championships is a professional wrestling championship promoted by the World Wrestling League (WWL) promotion in Puerto Rico.

The championship was generally contested in professional wrestling matches, in which participants execute scripted finishes rather than contend in direct competition.

Title history

References

Trios wrestling tag team championships
World Wrestling League Championships